Turtle Cove Beach is a gazetted beach in Southern District, Hong Kong, located west of Red Hill (Pak Pat Shan) and east of Stanley. The beach has barbecue pits and is managed by the Leisure and Cultural Services Department of the Hong Kong Government. The beach is rated as Grade 1 by the Environmental Protection Department for its water quality. Being about 73 metres long, it can easily be considered as a "baby beach".

History
In 2017, a palm oil spill from a Chinese mainland vessel collision nearby forced the closure of the beach for safety reasons.

Features
The beach has the following features:
 BBQ pits (12 nos.)
 Changing rooms
 Showers
 Toilets
 Playground
 Water sports centre

See also
 Beaches of Hong Kong

References

External links 

 Official website

Stanley, Hong Kong
Beaches of Hong Kong